Voskopoulos is a Greek surname. Notable people with the surname include:

Pavlos Voskopoulos (born 1964), Greek politician
Tolis Voskopoulos (1940–2021), Greek singer, actor, and composer

Greek-language surnames